Baldham station is a railway station in the municipality of Baldham, located in the Ebersberg district in Bavaria, Germany.

The station of Baldham was opened on 1 May 1897. Since 1972, the station has been served only by the S-Bahn. The island platform can be reached via an underpass.

References

Railway stations in Bavaria
Munich S-Bahn stations
Buildings and structures in Ebersberg (district)
Railway stations in Germany opened in 1897
1897 establishments in Bavaria